River Plate Aruba, known also as River Plate, or simply River, (previously named ASV River Plate) is an Aruban football club based in Madiki, Oranjestad. It was  founded  on 1 February 1953. They are currently playing in Aruba's first division Division di Honor.

Achievements

National Championships: 2
1993, 1997

Aruban Division Uno: 2
1960, 2007

Copa ABC : 1
1993

Participation in CONCACAF competitions
CONCACAF Champions League: 2 appearances
 1994 – Second Qualifying Round
 1995 – Preliminary Round

Players

Current squad
As of 11 September 2022

External links
Official site
River Plate Aruba Fan site

Football clubs in Aruba
Association football clubs established in 1953
1953 establishments in Aruba